Dinosaurs is a set of miniatures published by Grenadier subsidiary Pinnacle Products.

Contents
Dinosaurs are a set of nine 15mm figures, including Stegosaurus, Triceratops, Ankylosaurus, T. Rex, Parasaurolophus, and Protoceratops.

Reception
John Rankin reviewed Dinosaurs in Space Gamer No. 65. Rankin commented that "For the gamer this set offers a lot of possibilities; a Traveller adventure on a prehistoric planet comes instantly to mind. Even in 25mm the dinos could be youngsters (but still dangerous), while Tyrannosaurus becomes the similar, but smaller Allosaurus. On a cost for value basis, this set gets the highest recommendation. As the best serious effort in this field in many years, Dinosaurs rates as an absolute must-buy for any collector of dino miniatures."

References

See also
List of lines of miniatures

Miniature figures